Hartsburg may refer to:

Places
 Hartsburg, Illinois, United States
 Hartsburg, Missouri, United States
 Hartsburg, Ohio,  United States

People with the surname
 Chris Hartsburg (born 1980), American ice hockey player and coach
 Craig Hartsburg, a retired Canadian professional hockey player and head coach

See also
 Harburg (disambiguation)
 Hartberg, a city in Styria, Austria
 Harzburg, a former imperial castle overlooking Bad Harzburg, Lower Saxony, Germany